The 1905 DePauw football team was an American football team that represented the DePauw University in the 1905 college football season.

Schedule

References

DePauw
DePauw Tigers football seasons
DePauw football